Neospirifer is an extinct genus of articulate brachiopod fossils belonging to the family Trigonotretidae.

These stationary epifaunal suspension feeders lived in the Carboniferous and Permian periods, from 360.7 to 252.3 Ma.  Fossils of this genus have been found in the sediments of Europe, United States, Canada, China, Australia, India, Palistan Indonesia, Malaysia, Japan, Mexico, Argentina, Bolivia, Peru, Guatemala and Venezuela.

Description
Neospirifer species have shells with robust valves, a prominent sulcus and a characteristic ridge.

Species

References

Prehistoric brachiopod genera
Carboniferous first appearances
Permian genus extinctions
Spiriferida
Paleozoic life of British Columbia
Paleozoic life of Nunavut
Paleozoic life of Yukon